The Clarence S. Campbell Bowl, or simply the Campbell Bowl, is a team award presented by the National Hockey League (NHL). The Campbell Bowl has been awarded to the West Division regular season champions (1967–1974), the Campbell Conference regular season champions (1974–1981), the Campbell Conference playoff champions (1981–1993), and the Western Conference playoff champions (1993–2020, 2021–present).

Due to a modified playoff format held in 2021 because of the COVID-19 pandemic, the Campbell Bowl was awarded to the Montreal Canadiens after they defeated the Vegas Golden Knights in the Stanley Cup Semifinals.

History

The Clarence S. Campbell Bowl was donated by the NHL's clubs in recognition of the contributions and services of its namesake, the League President at the start of the Modern Era expansion. Throughout its history it has been a parallel to the Prince of Wales Trophy, using the same criteria in the opposite competitive grouping. From its inception in the  season through to  it was awarded to the first-place finisher in the West Division during the regular season. With NHL realignment in 1974–75, it was given to the team with the best regular season record in the Campbell Conference (the successor to the West Division) through the  season. Beginning with the  season, it switched to the Campbell Conference playoff champions, and since the  season, when the Campbell Conference became the Western Conference, the trophy has gone to the Western Conference playoff champions.

A traditional superstition that is prevalent among many of today's NHL players is that no player should either touch or hoist the Campbell (Western Conference champion) or Prince of Wales (Eastern Conference champion) trophies after they have won the conference playoffs; these players feel that the Stanley Cup is the true championship trophy and thus it should be the only trophy that they should be hoisting. Instead of touching the conference trophy, the captain of the winning team merely poses (usually looking solemn) with the trophy, and sometimes, the entire team poses as well. There have been other teams, however, that have ignored the superstition and hoisted the conference trophy and then went on to win the Cup anyway.

The NHL temporarily suspended the conferences and re-aligned the league into four temporary divisions for the 2020–21 NHL season due to the COVID-19 pandemic. As a result, the semifinal round of the 2021 Stanley Cup playoffs was contested between the winners of the divisional playoffs and they were seeded according to their regular season record. Initially the trophy was not going to be awarded. However, as it happened, the first round results caused a de facto firm bracket to be established for the rest of the playoffs in which the teams advancing from the North and West Divisions would play in the semifinals, and also where this half of the "bracket" contained all of the Western Conference teams remaining in the playoffs. As a result, it was decided that the Campbell Bowl would be awarded to the winner of the Stanley Cup Semifinals between the North and West Divisions. Eventually, Montreal Canadiens (the only Eastern Conference team in that half of the "bracket") defeated the Vegas Golden Knights to win their first and (barring a further change in the playoff format) only Campbell Bowl in their history.

Winners

Key
  – Eventual Stanley Cup champions

West Division regular season champions (1967–1974)

Campbell Conference regular season champions (1974–1981)

Campbell Conference playoffs champions (1981–1993)

Western Conference playoffs champions (1993–2020)

Stanley Cup Semifinals (2020–2021)

Western Conference playoffs champions (2021–present)

See also
 List of National Hockey League awards
 NHL Conference Finals
 Prince of Wales Trophy

References

External links
 Clarence S. Campbell Bowl history at NHL.com
 Clarence S. Campbell Bowl profile at Legends of Hockey.net

National Hockey League trophies and awards
Western Conference (NHL)
NHL Conference Finals